The Vermilion Cliffs are the second "step" up in the five-step Grand Staircase of the Colorado Plateau, in northern Arizona and southern Utah. They extend west from near Page, Arizona, for a considerable distance, in both Arizona and Utah.

 of the region were designated as the Paria Canyon-Vermilion Cliffs Wilderness in 1984. An even greater area was protected within Vermilion Cliffs National Monument in 2000.

Geology
The Vermilion Cliffs are composed of the resistant red sandstone beds of the Lower Jurassic Moenave and Kayenta Formations. They are made up of deposited silt and desert dunes, cemented by infiltrated carbonates and intensely colored by red iron oxide and other minerals, particularly bluish manganese.  They are in the physiographic High Plateaus Section and Canyon Lands Section of the Colorado Plateau Province.

History
The Vermillion Cliffs were on an important route from Utah to Arizona used by settlers during the 19th Century.  The area was explored by the Mormon pioneer and missionary Jacob Hamblin, who started a ranch at the base of the cliffs in House Rock Valley. Present day U.S. Highway 89A basically follows the old wagon route past the cliffs through House Rock Valley and up the Kaibab Plateau to Jacob Lake.

Famous locations in the cliff area include Lee's Ferry, Glen Canyon and the Glen Canyon National Recreation Area, The Wave, Coyote Buttes, and others.

Geography
Reddish or vermilion-colored cliffs are found along U.S. Highway 89A near Navajo Bridge, and may be seen from U.S. Highway 89 close to Bitter Springs. Highway 89A runs alongside the Vermilion Cliffs for most of its route between Jacob Lake and Marble Canyon, and offers a great view of the cliffs.

In the spring, after a good winter rain, the valley between Highway 89 and the Vermilion Cliffs will be covered with a carpet of desert mallow and other spring flowers.

In the image below, Highway 89A is atop the yellow rocks capping the first step of the series, the Chocolate Cliffs, and will turn east (to the right) upon entry to the valley below, ultimately crossing the Colorado River at Marble Canyon via the Navajo Bridge.

See also
 Vermilion Cliffs National Monument
 Paria Canyon-Vermilion Cliffs Wilderness
 California condor – Vermillion Cliffs are a release site.

References

External links
 Bureau of Land Management Condor viewing. – Condor viewing in the Vermilion Cliffs National Monument

Cliffs of the United States
Colorado Plateau
Cliffs of Arizona
Geology of Arizona
Geology of Utah
Landforms of Coconino County, Arizona
Landforms of Kane County, Utah